Colombicallia is a genus of longhorn beetles of the subfamily Lamiinae.

 Colombicallia albofasciata Martins & Galileo, 2006
 Colombicallia curta Galileo & Martins, 1992

References

Calliini